Leif Davis (born 31 December 1999) is an English professional footballer who plays for English League One club Ipswich Town as a left back. He can also play as a centre back. Davis is known for his crossing and ability to provide assists.

Career

Early career
Born in Newcastle upon Tyne, he started his career at English youth football club Wallsend Boys Club in Wallsend, North Tyneside.

On 27 June 2016, Davis joined Morecambe where he would come through the ranks of the academy.

Leeds United
On 4 July 2018, Davis joined EFL Championship side Leeds United under head coach Marcelo Bielsa for an undisclosed fee, where he initially linked up with the Leeds academy.

After impressing for Leeds' Under 23s, Davis was promoted to the first team and was named as an unused substitute on several occasions by head coach Bielsa before making his debut for the club on 23 December 2018, when he started in a 3–2 win against Aston Villa at Villa Park after Barry Douglas fell ill before kickoff.

With Davis potentially set for a spell in the side, after injuries to left backs Barry Douglas and Ezgjan Alioski, Davis himself was ruled out for the remainder of the season including Leeds' playoff campaign after knee surgery.

Davis was regularly named as an unused substitute on the bench for the first team squad in the Championship, but still featured regularly for Carlos Corberán's Leeds United under 23s side over the course the 2018–19 season, that won the PDL Northern League 2018–19 season and became the national Professional Development League champions by beating Birmingham City in the final.

After the English professional football season was paused in March 2020 due to the impact of COVID-19, the season was resumed during June, where Davis earned promotion with Leeds to the Premier League and also become the EFL Championship Champions for the 2019–20 season in July after the successful resumption of the season.

His first start of the 2020–21 season came on 16 September 2020 in Leeds' 1–1 draw against Hull City in the EFL Cup. Hull went on to win 9–8 on penalties. Davis made his Premier League debut for Leeds, as a second half substitute in Leeds' 1–1 draw with Manchester City on 3 October 2020.

AFC Bournemouth (loan)
On 27 July 2021, Davis joined Championship side AFC Bournemouth on a season-long loan deal. He made his debut for the club coming on as a late sub in the Cherries 2–1 win over Nottingham Forest. Davis then made his first start for Bournemouth in an unfamiliar right wing role, in a 0–2 away win at Birmingham City.

Ipswich Town
On 25 July 2022, Davis joined Ipswich Town on a three-year contract for a seven-figure fee.

Style of play
Davis predominantly plays as a left back. He was converted by Carlos Corberán to also play as a centre back. Davis describes his style as a "a modern-day, attacking left-back".

Career statistics

Honours
Leeds United
EFL Championship: 2019–20

AFC Bournemouth
EFL Championship runner-up: 2021–22

References

External links
Profile at the Ipswich Town F.C. website

1999 births
Living people
Footballers from Newcastle upon Tyne
English footballers
Association football fullbacks
Wallsend Boys Club players
Morecambe F.C. players
Leeds United F.C. players
AFC Bournemouth players
Ipswich Town F.C. players
English Football League players
Premier League players